Garrick Higgo (born 12 May 1999) is a South African professional golfer who currently plays on the PGA Tour, European Tour and the Sunshine Tour. He has won three times on the European Tour, winning the 2020 Open de Portugal and the Gran Canaria Lopesan Open as well as the Canary Islands Championship in 2021. 

He won his first PGA Tour title in his second start, at the Palmetto Championship.

Amateur career
Higgo attended the University of Nevada-Las Vegas in 2017 and 2018, turning professional during his sophomore year.

Professional career
Higgo turned professional in early 2019 and won twice in his first full season on the Sunshine Tour, at the Sun City Challenge and the season-ending Tour Championship. He also recorded a runner-up finish in the Challenge Tour co-sanctioned Cape Town Open during the 2019–20 season and finished 6th on the Order of Merit.

Higgo secured a place on the Challenge Tour for the 2020 season by making the cut at the European Tour Qualifying School. In September 2020, at the Open de Portugal, a dual-ranking event on the European and Challenge tours, he shot a bogey-free final round of 65 to win by one stroke and gain a one-year exemption on the European Tour.

In April 2021, Higgo secured his second European Tour victory at the Gran Canaria Lopesan Open. He won the event with an aggregate score of 255, beating Andy Sullivan's record of 257 previously set in 2020. Two weeks later, Higgo won again in the Canary Islands, at the Canary Islands Championship, a final score of 27 under-par; 257, saw him win by six shots ahead of Maverick Antcliff.

In June 2021, Higgo won the PGA Tour's Palmetto Championship in South Carolina by one stroke. With the win, Higgo won more than $1,300,000 and secured PGA Tour membership through the end of the 2023 season.

Personal life
Higgo was born on 12 May 1999 in Johannesburg, South Africa, to Susan and Michael Higgo. He started playing golf socially with his father at a very young age and developed an early passion for the game. In 2008, when Higgo was aged 9, his father died in a car crash.

Higgo attended Paul Roos Gymnasium in the town of Stellenbosch. He has been mentored by South African golfer, Gary Player throughout his career and often meets with Player to discuss course and play strategies. Higgo lives in the town of Stellenbosch in the Western Cape province of South Africa. Higgo has two siblings, Calista and Michael.

Amateur wins
2016 Curro South African Juniors International, Northern Amateur Open, Central Gauteng Open Stroke Play
2017 Nomads National Order of Merit (Coastal), Cape Province Open, The Bobby Locke Open, Harry Oppenheimer Trophy

Source:

Professional wins (7)

PGA Tour wins (1)

European Tour wins (3)

1Dual-ranking event with the Challenge Tour

Sunshine Tour wins (2)

Challenge Tour wins (1)

1Dual-ranking event with the European Tour

Big Easy Tour wins (1)

Results in major championships

CUT = missed the half-way cut
"T" = tied

Results in The Players Championship

CUT = missed the halfway cut
"T" indicates a tie for a place

Results in World Golf Championships

1Cancelled due to COVID-19 pandemic

WD = withdrew
NT = No tournament

Team appearances
Amateur
Junior Presidents Cup (representing the International team): 2017

References

External links

South African male golfers
Sunshine Tour golfers
European Tour golfers
PGA Tour golfers
Olympic golfers of South Africa
Golfers at the 2020 Summer Olympics
Left-handed golfers
Golfers from Johannesburg
1999 births
Living people